Medini Iskandar Malaysia is a suburb in Iskandar Puteri, Johor Bahru District, Johor, Malaysia.

Medini is a  urban township development planned for a population of 450,000 by 2030. Medini is Malaysia's largest single urban development to date and will become the smart and connected Central Business District of Iskandar Puteri. The gross development value of Medini stands at US$20 billion spanning 15 to 20 years.

Name
The name Medini comes from the ancient name of the southern tip of Peninsular Malaysia, Ujong Medini.

History
Established in 2007, MIM's original shareholders included: Iskandar Investment Berhad (‘IIB’) (75%) – majority owned by Khazanah Nasional Berhad (‘KNB’) – and United World Infrastructure (‘UWI’) (25%). The development was launched at CityScape Dubai, an annual property investment trade show for the real estate industry.

In 2008, IIB and UWI established two public-private partnerships with additional Middle Eastern partners to facilitate the development of Medini: Global Capital and Development Sdn Bhd. with Mubadala from Abu Dhabi and Medini Central Sdn Bhd with Kuwait Finance House (‘KFH’) from Kuwait.

In 2013, Mitsui & Co Ltd. acquired 20% of the shares in MIM to support the development of Medini's smart city infrastructure and services.

Today, shareholders of MIM include Jasmine Acres Sdn Bhd (60%), UWI (20%), and Mitsui & Co., Ltd (20%). Jasmine Acres is jointly owned by IIB and KNB.

Medini Iskandar Malaysia Sdn Bhd 
The company behind Medini's development is Medini Iskandar Malaysia Sdn Bhd ("MIM"). a public-private partnership between a group of Malaysian Government Linked Companies (GLCs) and private investors.

Since MIM's inception in 2007, the company has been responsible for each stage of the development value chain: from master planning and developing the infrastructure, to being a building developer and a township management service provider.

Medini Masterplan
The Medini masterplan was designed upon UWI's economic cluster model. Economic clusters are mixed-use, urban developments with a 24-hour lifecycle which offer convenient live, work, and leisure activities for residents, visitors, and workers. Each cluster is integrated within the surrounding economic network.

The masterplan is divided into 5 independently themed zones:

Zone A; Medini North

Zone A includes LEGOLAND® Malaysia Resort, Mall of Medini, Gleneagles Medini Hospital, and the Afiniti Medini. an urban wellness project including Somerset Medini Serviced Suites and CIMB Leadership Training Centre.

Zone B; Medini Business District

Zone B is a planned business and media district which includes office space, residential buildings and community centers.

Zone C, D and E; Medini Central

Medini Central includes trade and logistics, creative parks and a heritage district.  Zone E, now known as Avira, is a 207-acre development for wellness initiatives with a dedicated wellness center.

Zone F; Medini South

Zone F features Sunway Iskandar. Sunway Iskandar, known as Nature's Capital City, is home to eco-parks, villas, boutique retail centers, and a health and wellness village.

Medini Regulatory Framework
Medini's regulatory framework was created through a collaboration between MIM and the Iskandar Regional Development Authority (IRDA) to attract investors and support national economic development. IRDA facilitates licensing and registration requirements for new businesses and investors. In addition, there are also fiscal and non-fiscal incentive packages specific to Medini.

Smart City Initiatives 
Medini's township management services are provided through partnerships between MIM and specialized service providers. In 2015, MIM signed two joint venture agreements: with a subsidiary company of Telekom Malaysia, to provide ICT services,  and with UEM Sunrise Edgenta to provide estate and building management services.

Tourist attractions
 Legoland Malaysia Resort
 Mall of Medini

Public transportation

Getting here is easy by public transportation. Below is the list of buses that ply to and fro Medini. The main bus stop in this area is the Mall of Medini/ Legoland Malaysia Resort.

References

External links
 Medini Official Portal
 Medini Central English
 Medini Central Mandarin

2008 establishments in Malaysia
Iskandar Puteri
Towns and suburbs in Johor Bahru District

Development Corridors in Malaysia
Smart cities